Lumbala Airport  is an airport serving the town of Lumbala N'guimbo in the Moxico Province of Angola.

See also

 List of airports in Angola
 Transport in Angola

References

External links 
OpenStreetMap - Lumbala
OurAirports - Lumbala

Airports in Angola